The Way I Feel is a studio album by American country singer-songwriter Bill Anderson. It was released on June 14, 2005 on TWI Records and the Varèse Sarabande label. The project was produced by Anderson himself, along with three additional producers. The album was Anderson's 40th studio recording in his music career and contained ten self-penned tracks. Included among the album's material was the song "Whiskey Lullaby", which was first a hit for Brad Paisley and Alison Krauss.

Background and content
The Way I Feel was produced by Anderson himself in collaboration with Sabino Allegrini, Rex Schnelle and Mike Toppins. Both musicians had previously produced records with Anderson. The project was a collection of ten tracks, all of which Anderson had a hand in writing. To facilitate the writing process, he collaborated with Buddy Cannon, Melba Montgomery and Jon Randall. "When I first started this co-writing thing, back in the mid-’90s, man, I went nuts. I thought, ’Well, shoot, I want to write every day'," he recalled. Among the featured songs is the tune "Whiskey Lullaby", which he co-wrote with Randall. The song had first been cut by Brad Paisley and Alison Krauss and became a major hit in 2004.

Release and reception

The Way I Feel was released on June 14, 2005 via Anderson's own label (TWI Records). It was distributed with the help of the Varèse Sarabande recording company. It was originally released as a compact disc. The album did not chart on any publication at the time of its release, including Billboard. The album spawned one single in 2005 called "Him and Me". The single did not chart on any Billboard publications as well, including the Hot Country Songs chart.

The Way I Feel was reviewed by Al Campbell of Allmusic, who gave the effort 3.5 out of 5 stars. Campbell praised the album's sound, which he called a "contemporary country" style. He also praised the album's various songwriting pairings. "The Way I Feel may not be the first "Whispering Bill" disc to purchase, but it does justice to Bill Anderson's massive catalog, which has endured for over four decades," he concluded.

Track listing

Personnel
All credits are adapted from the liner notes of The Way I Feel and Allmusic.

Musical personnel
 Bill Anderson – lead vocals
 Rustie Blue – guest artist
 Chip Davis – background vocals
 Glen Duncan – fiddle
 James Freeze – bass
 Donna Hammitt – dobro, steel guitar
 Cotton Payne – drums
 Buck Reid – steel guitar
 Tammy Rogers – fiddle
 Gail Rudisill-Johnson – fiddle
 Rex Schnelle – background vocals, banjo, bass, drums, dulcimer, acoustic guitar, electric guitar, keyboards, mandolin
 Lester Earl Singer – acoustic guitar, banjo
 Mike Toppins – background vocals, dobro, steel guitar, keyboards
 Kenzie Wetz – background vocals, fiddle

Technical personnel
 Sabino Allegrini – producer
 Bill Anderson – audio production, producer
 Anthony "Ziggy" Johnson – mastering
 Cary E. Mansfield – audio production
 Ron Modra – cover photo
 Bill Pitzonka – art direction
 Rex Schnelle – mixing, producer
 Mike Toppins – mixing, producer

Release history

References

2005 albums
Albums produced by Bill Anderson (singer)
Bill Anderson (singer) albums
Varèse Sarabande albums